Enzo Pablo Roco Roco (born Enzo Pablo Andía Roco; 16 August 1992) is a Chilean professional footballer who plays as a central defender for La Liga club Elche and the Chile national team.

Club career
Born in Ovalle, Roco joined Universidad Católica's youth setup in 2008 from the Academia Municipal de Fútbol Ovalle (Municipal Football Academy of Ovalle), aged fifteen. He was definitely promoted to the first-team in 2011, and played his first match as a professional on 8 May 2011, starting and being sent off in a 0–0 home draw against Unión Española.

On 24 September Roco scored his first professional goal, but in a 3–2 loss at Santiago Morning. He established himself as a starter in the following campaigns, being an ever-present figure during the club's Primera División and Copa Chile titles.

On 31 July 2014, Roco joined La Liga side Elche CF on loan with a buyout clause. He made his debut in the competition on 31 August, playing the full 90 minutes in a 1–1 home draw against Granada CF.

On 31 July 2015, Roco moved to fellow league club RCD Espanyol, on loan from O'Higgins for one year with an option to buy.

On 28 June 2016, Eduardo de la Torre announced the arrival of Enzo along with Chilean teammate Francisco Silva. After, the municipal council of Ovalle declared him an Hijo Ilustre ('Honoured son') of the community.

Roco joined Turkish side Beşiktaş on a four-season contract on 27 July 2018. The contract between Beşiktaş and Roco was mutually terminated grounded upon conclusion that Roco to be paid his pending receivables worthing €700,000, on 6 September 2020. On 7 September 2020, another Süper Lig contestant Fatih Karagümrük S.K. announced that Roco joined their team.

On 9 July 2021, it was announced that Roco would rejoin Elche on a two-year deal, coming back after six years to play for former manager Fran Escribá.

International career
After appearing with the under-17 squad in 2009, Roco made his debut with the main squad on 15 February 2012, starting and playing the full 90 minutes of a 2–0 loss against Paraguay. He scored his first international goal on 22 March, netting his side's second of a 3–1 home win against Peru.

On 13 May 2014, Roco was named in Jorge Sampaoli's 30-man list for 2014 FIFA World Cup, but was one of the seven players cut from the final list.

Personal life
On 8 July 2014 Roco changed his surname Andía to Roco, honoring his mother and grandfather.

Career statistics

Scores and results list Chile's goal tally first, score column indicates score after each Roco goal.

Honours
Universidad Católica U18
Campeonato Fútbol Joven: 2009

Universidad Católica
Primera División: 2010
Copa Chile: 2011

Chile
Copa América: 2016

Individual
Hijo Ilustre de Ovalle: 2016

References

External links

1992 births
Living people
People from Ovalle
Chilean footballers
Chilean expatriate footballers
Chile youth international footballers
Chile international footballers
Association football central defenders
Club Deportivo Universidad Católica footballers
Elche CF players
O'Higgins F.C. footballers
RCD Espanyol footballers
Cruz Azul footballers
Beşiktaş J.K. footballers
Fatih Karagümrük S.K. footballers
Chilean Primera División players
La Liga players
Liga MX players
Süper Lig players
Expatriate footballers in Spain
Expatriate footballers in Mexico
Expatriate footballers in Turkey
Chilean expatriate sportspeople in Spain
Chilean expatriate sportspeople in Mexico
Chilean expatriate sportspeople in Turkey
Copa América Centenario players
2017 FIFA Confederations Cup players
2021 Copa América players
Copa América-winning players